Li Zhongyi may refer to:
 Li Zhongyi (swimmer)
 Li Zhongyi (footballer)